Tocotronic is a German rock band founded in 1993 (see 1993 in music). Similar to Blumfeld or Die Sterne they are considered a part of the Hamburger Schule (Hamburg School) movement. They are influential for bands such as Wir sind Helden.

Tocotronic were signed by L'Age D'Or, a German independent record label situated in Hamburg, in 1994 after quickly gaining popularity in the local scene. Their early style consists of ironic sloganeering ("I want to be part of a youth movement") and almost diary-like songwriting, paired with a lo-fi rock sound with elements of punk rock and grunge. In 1995, they released their debut album Digital ist besser (Digital is better), followed by their second album Nach der verlorenen Zeit (After the Lost Time) only a few months later. Their third album, released in 1996, was the first to hit the German charts. The music became more complex over time, their lyrics less direct, resulting in a sound that was compared to that of Pavement on Tocotronic's 1999 album K.O.O.K. The self-titled "White Album", released in 2002, features dreamlike songs; metaphoric, heavily produced, highly polished, it completes a slow but steady course away from their early works ("eins zu eins ist jetzt vorbei" - "one-to-one is over now").

Despite never being overly commercially successful, Tocotronic have a steady fanbase in Germany and their records are regularly reviewed and acclaimed in mainstream newspapers and music magazines alike.

In July 2007, Tocotronic released their eighth studio album, Kapitulation. Also, around this time, the band announced the end of their working relationship with long-time label L'age D'or, and consequently, Kapitulation was released by Vertigo Berlin, a sublabel of Universal music. Their ninth studio album, "Schall & Wahn", was released in January 2010 and became their first number-one record. Wie Wir Leben Wollen, was released on 25 January 2013 and Tocotronic (commonly known as "Das Rote Album", or "The Red Album") was released on 1 May 2015.

The current band members and positions are Jan Müller (bass), Arne Zank (drums), Dirk von Lowtzow (rhythm guitar, vocals), and, since 2004, Rick McPhail (lead guitar, keyboard).

Discography

Studio albums
 1995: Digital ist besser ("Digital Is Better")
 1995: Nach der verlorenen Zeit ("After Lost Time")
 1996: Wir kommen um uns zu beschweren ("We Come to Complain")
 1997: Es ist egal, aber ("It Doesn't Matter, But")
 1999: K.O.O.K.
 1999: K.O.O.K. (English Version)
 2002: Tocotronic
 2005: Pure Vernunft darf niemals siegen ("Pure Reason Must Never Win")
 2007: Kapitulation ("Capitulation")
 2010: Schall und Wahn (literally "Sound and Delusion", Schall und Wahn being the title of the German translation of William Faulkner's The Sound and the Fury) (GER: #1)
 2013: Wie wir leben wollen ("How We Aim to Live")
 2015: Tocotronic (Das rote Album) ("Tocotronic (The Red Album)")
 2018: Die Unendlichkeit ("Infinity")
 2022: Nie wieder Krieg ("No More War")

Best of, live, remixes 
 1998: Live in Roskilde (limited edition of 2222 CDs, mailorder only)
 1998: The Hamburg Years (export only)
 1998: Tocotronic - Tocotronics (VHS/PAL)
 2000: K.O.O.K. - Variationen (remixes done by a number of artists)
 2004: Tocotronic – 10th Anniversary (CD/DVD)
 2005: The Best of Tocotronic (CD/double-CD)
 2008: Kapitulation Live
 2013: >20<

Singles and EPs 
 1994: Meine Freundin und ihr Freund (7"; My girlfriend and her boyfriend)
 1995: Freiburg (live, 7")
 1995: Ich möchte Teil einer Jugendbewegung sein (12"; I want to be part of a youth movement)
 1995: You are quite cool (7")
 1996: Die Welt kann mich nicht mehr verstehen (12"/CD; The world can't understand me anymore)
 1996: Split with Chokebore (7")
 1996: Split with Christoph de Babalon (7")
 1997: Dieses Jahr (12"/CD; This year)
 1997: Sie wollen uns erzählen (12"/CD; They want to tell us)
 1997: Themenabend (Live In Dresden, 7", limited edition: 500 pieces Red Vinyl; Theme evening)
 1998: Split with Fuck (7")
 1999: Jackpot (12"/CD)
 1999: Let There Be Rock (12"/CD)
 1999: Live auf dem Petersberg (7", limited edition: 1000 pieces - 500 Clear / 500 Black Vinyl; Live on Petersberg)
 2000: Freiburg V 3.0 (12"/CD, with Console)
 2000: Variationen I + II (2 EPs; Variations)
 2002: Hi Freaks I + II (2×12"/CD)
 2002: This Boy Is Tocotronic (12"/CD)
 2005: Aber hier leben, nein danke (12"/CD; But living here, no, thanks)
 2005: Gegen den Strich (12"/CD); Against the grain)
 2005: Pure Vernunft darf niemals siegen Remixes (12"/CD on Kompakt Records; Pure Reason Nust Never Prevail)
 2007: Kapitulation (12"/CD; Surrender)
 2007: Imitationen (12"/CD; Imitations)
 2007: Sag alles ab (7", limited edition: 1.500 pieces, handnumbered; Call off everything)
 2010: Macht es nicht selbst (7"/12"; Don't do it yourselves)
 2010: Im Zweifel für den Zweifel (7": When in Doubt, for the Doubt)
 2010: Die Folter endet nie (7": The Torture never ends)
 2013: Auf dem Pfad der Dämmerung (7": On the Path of Twilight)
 2013: Ich will für dich nüchtern bleiben (7": I want to stay sober for you)
 2013: Warte auf mich auf dem Grund des Swimmingpools (7": Wait for me on the Bottom of the Swimming Pool)
 2015: Prolog (7": Prologue)
 2015: Die Erwachsenen (7": The Adults)
 2015: Zucker (7": Sugar)

Compilations
 Four-beat Rhythm: The Writings of Wilhelm Reich

References

External links

 Official Site
 MySpace Page
 Tocotronic Ushered in New Era of German Rock Deutsche Welle
 Tocotronic on Jerusalem student radio part#1 and part#2
 Tocotronic's Rick McPhail
 Tocotronic on the Music-Map

German indie rock groups
Musical groups from Hamburg
Culture in Hamburg
Musical groups established in 1993